The canton of Biguglia-Nebbio is an administrative division of the Haute-Corse department, southeastern France. It was created at the French canton reorganisation which came into effect in March 2015. Its seat is in Biguglia.

It consists of the following communes:
 
Barbaggio
Biguglia
Murato
Oletta
Olmeta-di-Tuda
Piève
Poggio-d'Oletta
Rapale
Rutali
Saint-Florent
San-Gavino-di-Tenda
Santo-Pietro-di-Tenda
Sorio
Vallecalle

References

Cantons of Haute-Corse